Raut Nacha is a dance performed by Yadavas, a caste which are descendants of Krishna. For them it is as a symbol of worship to Krishna. They perform the dance at the time of 'dev udhni ekadashi'. It is believed that it is time of awakening of Gods after brief rest according to Hindu panchang (calendar).

Reference

Dances of India
Folk dances of Chhattisgarh